Beg, Borrow or Steal is a 1937 American comedy film directed by Wilhelm Thiele and written by Leonard Lee, Harry Ruskin and Marion Parsonnet. The film stars Frank Morgan, Florence Rice, John Beal, Janet Beecher, Herman Bing and Erik Rhodes. The film was released on December 3, 1937, by Metro-Goldwyn-Mayer.

Plot
Con-man Ingraham Steward promises his daughter a luxurious wedding at his château in the French Riviera, although he doesn't really own the château. He induces the caretaker, Bill Cherau, to go along with his facade.

On the day of the wedding, Bill falls in love with Ingraham's daughter and she feels the same, but still plans to have her intended wedding. Later, Ingraham has a change of heart and confesses that the château is not his. His daughter forgives him and goes to her true love Bill, whom is not actually a caretaker.

Cast 
Frank Morgan as Ingraham Steward
Florence Rice as Joyce Steward
John Beal as Count Bill Cherau
Janet Beecher as Mrs. Agatha Steward
Herman Bing as Von Giersdorff
Erik Rhodes as Lefevre
George Givot as Izmanov
E. E. Clive as Lord Nigel Braemer
Tom Rutherford as Horace Miller 
Cora Witherspoon as Mrs. Elizabeth Miller
Reginald Denny as Clifton Summitt
Vladimir Sokoloff as Sascha
Harlan Briggs as Mr. Virgil Miller

References

External links 
 

1937 films
1930s English-language films
American comedy films
1937 comedy films
Metro-Goldwyn-Mayer films
Films directed by Wilhelm Thiele
American black-and-white films
Films with screenplays by Wilhelm Thiele
1930s American films